César Paes (born 1959), is a Brazilian French filmmaker. He has directed several critically acclaimed feature documentaries including: Angano... Angano..., Mahaleo and L'opéra du bout du monde. Apart from direction, he is also a producer, writer and cinematographer.

Personal life
César Paes was born in 1955 in Campos, Rio de Janeiro, Brazil.

He is married to Marie-Clémence Andriamonta, who is also a Franco-Malagasy director.

Career
In 1988, he launched an independent production company based in Paris called Laterit Productions together with his wife Marie. The production company is committed in distribution and publishing. With his wife Marie, he directed documentaries such as Angano...Angano... Tales from Madagascar, To the warriors of silence, Saudade do Futuro and Songs for Madagascar won several top awards at Cinéma du Réel, Festival dei Popoli and Dok Leipzig.

In 2012, he co-directed the documentary L'Opéra du bout du monde which is the story of the creation of a contemporary opera from Reunion Island recounting the arrival of Louis XIV's officers in the islands of the Indian Ocean.

Filmography

References

External links
 
 Fahavalo, Madagascar 1947

French documentary film directors
Living people
Brazilian documentary film directors
Brazilian film directors
French film directors
1955 births